Žan Vipotnik (born 18 March 2002) is a Slovenian football forward who plays for Slovenian PrvaLiga side Maribor.

References

2002 births
Living people
Slovenian footballers
Association football forwards
Slovenia youth international footballers
Slovenia under-21 international footballers
NK Maribor players
ND Gorica players
NK Triglav Kranj players
Slovenian PrvaLiga players
Slovenian Second League players